The 2014–15 IUPUI Jaguars men's basketball team represented Indiana University – Purdue University Indianapolis during the 2014–15 NCAA Division I men's basketball season. The Jaguars, led by first year head coach Jason Gardner, played their home games at Fairgrounds Coliseum, which was renamed Indiana Farmers Coliseum on December 2, and were members of The Summit League. They finished the season 10–21, 6–10 in Summit League play to finish in a tie for sixth place. They lost in the quarterfinals of The Summit League tournament to Oral Roberts.

Roster

Schedule

|-
!colspan=9 style="background:#990000; color:#CFB53B;"| Exhibition

|-
!colspan=9 style="background:#990000; color:#CFB53B;"| Regular season

|-
!colspan=9 style="background:#990000; color:#CFB53B;"| The Summit League tournament

References

IUPUI Jaguars men's basketball seasons
IUPUI
IUPUI
IUPUI